Patagonia National Park is a national park in southern Argentina. It was designated in 2015, and covers an area of 528.11 km2. It protects a portion of the Patagonian steppe.

Patagonia Wilderness Nature Reserve (387.87 km2), designated in 2018, adjoins the national park to the north and east.

References

National parks of Argentina
Patagonia
2015 establishments in Argentina
Protected areas established in 2015